Christina Confalonieri (Korean: 크리스티나 콘팔로니에리; born March 8, 1981) is an Italian-born South Korean broadcaster and radio host. She moved to Seoul from Milano and studied Korean at KHU Institute of International Education. She appeared on a Korean talk show, A Chat with Beauties, and has been a member of Global Talk Show since 2007. She is adjunct professor of Department of Law in Catholic University of Korea. She is the co-host of the radio show 입에서 톡-이탈리아어 broadcast by EBS FM. She has been the head of Yeoksam Global Village Center since 2008. She has been a special guest in the final episode of the ninth season of Pechino Express. 

She hopes to help foreigners living in South Korea become accustomed to the local language and culture.

Publications
 크리스티나처럼 (2008)

References

1981 births
Living people
Italian television personalities
Italian radio presenters
Italian women radio presenters
South Korean television presenters
South Korean radio presenters
South Korean women radio presenters
Mass media people from Milan
Academic staff of the Catholic University of Korea